Robertson is an important lunar impact crater that is located on the far side of the Moon, just beyond the western limb. It lies just to the south of Berkner, a formation with a comparable size but more eroded features. Just to the east is Helberg, and to the southwest is Alter.

The inner wall of the crater rim has a wide, complex formation of multiple terraces. The rim is approximately circular, but with an irregular outline where various terraces have slumped away. The interior has a central peak at the midpoint, and this is joined to a rugged stretch of ground that connects with the northeastern rim. A band of light-hued ray material from Ohm covers the southern half of the crater floor and rim.

References

 
 
 
 
 
 
 
 
 
 
 
 

Impact craters on the Moon